Life Education Australia (Life Ed) is the largest and most recognised health education provider in Australian schools.

It is a not-for-profit organisation that adopts a holistic approach to health, covering critical areas of the Australian curriculum and state syllabi. Lessons are divided into three interrelated streams: physical health, social and emotional wellbeing and safety.  

Life Ed is on a mission to help children thrive supporting children, teachers and families with programs and resources, to address the complex challenges children face today.  

Whilst Life Ed’s programs continually evolve, it’s vision remains the same: Healthy Australians living to their full potential.

Life Ed  reaches on average 700,000 children annually where qualified educators present evidence-based preventative health and wellbeing education, along with Healthy Harold, the giraffe puppet and mascot who is the face of the organisation.

Founded in 1979 by Ted Noffs, the organisation is well loved by generations of Australians.

History 
Life Education Australia began in 1979, in The Wayside Chapel in Kings Cross by Reverend Ted Noffs, who used his experience with religion to focus on an action-based approach as opposed to preaching.

In 2016, the program began to teach topics of illicit drug use like methamphetamine, in response to rising narcotics usage rates in Australia.

In 2017, the Australian government announced plans to defund the program, but was not implemented after public backlash.

The in-person program was temporary halted and moved online due to restrictions placed by the Australian government in response to the COVID-19 pandemic, but resumed on October 13, 2020.

References

External links 
 Life Education Australia Website

Health education in Australia
Law enforcement in Australia
History of drug control
1979 establishments in Australia